The 45 ft Watson-class was a non self-righting displacement hull lifeboat built between 1919 and 1925 and operated by the Royal National Lifeboat Institution between 1919 and 1956.

History
In 1898 the first 45 ft Watson was built, one of the largest pulling and sailing lifeboats built for the RNLI. Only three of these 45 footers were built, the last in 1901. A 40 bhp Tylor C 4-cylinder petrol engine was fitted but little else was changed and, like all single engine lifeboats, a full sailing rig and drop keel was retained. The boat returned to service at Clacton in 1912 and served there until 1929. With the conversion of ON 463 deemed a success, plans were put in hand for the production of a series of 45 ft Watson motors, but due to the First World War, the first boat did not appear until 1919.

Description
Like ON 463 the first eleven production boats were open decked and retained full sail plans and a drop keel. The first seven boats were powered by a 60 bhp Tylor D1 6-cylinder petrol engine, while the rest had an RNLI designed 80 bhp DE6 6-cylinder petrol engine, nine of which were built by Weyburn Engineering and five by J. Samuel White. Experience showed that the open deck layout was inadequate for the longer services operated by the motor lifeboats and from the late 1920s a shelter was added ahead of the steering position. The final ten boats, built from 1923(ON 684), were to a revised design with a cabin capable of taking twenty survivors ahead of the engine room.

Fleet
ON is the RNLIs sequential Official Number.

External links
RNLI